The Todgha Gorges are a series of limestone river canyons, or wadi, in the eastern part of the High Atlas Mountains in Morocco, near the town of Tinerhir. Both the Todgha and neighbouring Dades Rivers are responsible for carving out these deep cliff-sided canyons, on their final  through the mountains.

Description 

The last  of the Todgha gorge are the most spectacular.

During the dry season, the canyon floor is mostly dry; at most there will be a small stream of water. During this time, the wadi floor is easily traversed by travelers. During the rainy season, however, the Todra can expand massively, covering the canyon floor in a strong torrent.

Access 
The area is no longer as remote as it once was. A well-maintained asphalt road leads up the valley from Tinerhir to the gorge. A concrete road continues up the valley, past the hotels at the mouth of the gorge all the way to the villages of Aït Hani, and Tamtatouchte.

Thanks to its robust rock sides with many uneven surfaces, Todgha Gorge is popular among rock climbers. More than 150 routes rated French Grade 5+ to 8 have been bolted in the canyon.

Film appearances 
The Todgha Gorge was featured on the premiere of the American reality show Expedition Impossible. It was also featured prominently in a 2012 advertisement for the Cadillac CTS.

References

External links 

 UK Climbing - Rock Climbing in the todgha Gorge

Canyons and gorges of Morocco
Geography of Drâa-Tafilalet